Anna Teresa Bogucka-Skowrońska (born February 23, 1942 in Radom ) is a Polish politician, lawyer , senator of the Polish Parliament of the 1st, 2nd and 4th cadence, former judge of the State Tribunal for 2 terms.

Awards and decorations
2016: Cross of Freedom and Solidarity
2009: Commander's Cross of the Order of Polonia Restituta
2002: Officer's Cross of the Order of Polonia Restituta

References

1942 births
Civic Platform politicians
Solidarity Electoral Action politicians
Democratic Party – demokraci.pl politicians
Recipients of Cross of Freedom and Solidarity
Adam Mickiewicz University in Poznań alumni
Officers of the Order of Polonia Restituta
Commanders of the Order of Polonia Restituta
Solidarity (Polish trade union) activists
People from Radom
People from Słupsk
Polish women lawyers
Members of the Senate of the Republic of Poland
Living people
20th-century Polish judges